Manalar Waterfalls is situated at Achankovil in Kollam district of Kerala. It is on the eastern area of Kollam District and Konni forest. Manalar Waterfall is about 112 km away from Kollam city.

See also
 Kumbhavurutty Waterfalls
 Palaruvi Falls
 Oliyarik Waterfalls

References

Waterfalls of Kollam district